Horváth Krisztofer György (born 8 January 2002) is a Hungarian professional footballer who plays as a midfielder for Kecskemét on loan from Italian club Torino.

Career 
On 26 July 2020, Horváth made his Serie A debut for SPAL in a 1–1 home draw against Torino.

On 25 September 2020, he joined Torino.

On 10 August 2022, Horváth was loaned to Debrecen. On 16 January 2023, he moved on a new loan to Kecskemét.

Career statistics

Club

Notes

References

2002 births
Living people
Hungarian footballers
Association football midfielders
Hungary youth international footballers
Hungary under-21 international footballers
Nemzeti Bajnokság II players
Serie A players
Nemzeti Bajnokság I players
Zalaegerszegi TE players
S.P.A.L. players
Torino F.C. players
Szeged-Csanád Grosics Akadémia footballers
Debreceni VSC players
Kecskeméti TE players
Hungarian expatriate footballers
Hungarian expatriate sportspeople in Italy
Expatriate footballers in Italy